Carl Nelson may refer to:

 Carl Nelson (wrestler), Danish Greco-Roman wrestler
 Carl M. Nelson (1892–?), member of the Wisconsin State Assembly
 Carl T. Nelson (1900–?), American football player and coach

See also
Karl Nelson, former American football player
Carl Nielsen (disambiguation)
Carl E. Nelson House, a historic house in Salem, Oregon, USA